In phonetics and phonology, a sonorant or resonant is a speech sound that is produced with continuous, non-turbulent airflow in the vocal tract; these are the manners of articulation that are most often voiced in the world's languages. This set of sounds contrasts with the obstruents (stops, affricates and fricatives).

For some authors, only the term resonant is used with this broader meaning, while sonorant is restricted to consonants, referring to nasals and liquids but not vocoids (vowels and semivowels).

Types
Whereas obstruents are frequently voiceless, sonorants are almost always voiced. A typical sonorant consonant inventory found in many languages comprises the following: two nasals , two semivowels , and two liquids .

In the sonority hierarchy, all sounds higher than fricatives are sonorants. They can therefore form the nucleus of a syllable in languages that place that distinction at that level of sonority; see Syllable for details.

Sonorants contrast with obstruents, which do stop or cause turbulence in the airflow. The latter group includes fricatives and stops (for example,  and ).

Among consonants pronounced in the back of the mouth or in the throat, the distinction between an approximant and a voiced fricative is so blurred that no language is known to contrast them. Thus, uvular, pharyngeal, and glottal fricatives never contrast with approximants.

Voiceless
Voiceless sonorants are rare; they occur as phonemes in only about 5% of the world's languages. They tend to be extremely quiet and difficult to recognise, even for those people whose language has them.

In every case of a voiceless sonorant occurring, there is a contrasting voiced sonorant.

Voiceless sonorants are most common around the Pacific Ocean (in Oceania, East Asia, and North and South America) and in certain language families (such as Austronesian, Sino-Tibetan, Na-Dene and Eskimo–Aleut).

One European language with voiceless sonorants is Welsh. Its phonology contains a phonemic voiceless alveolar trill , along with three voiceless nasals: velar, alveolar and labial.

Another European language with voiceless sonorants is Icelandic, with [l̥ r̥ n̥ m̥ ɲ̊ ŋ̊] for the corresponding voiced sonorants [l r n m ɲ ŋ].

Voiceless  and possibly  are hypothesized to have occurred in various dialects of Ancient Greek. Hence, many English words from Ancient Greek roots have rh initially and rrh medially: rhetoric, diarrhea.

Examples
English has the following sonorant consonantal phonemes: .

Old Irish had one of the most complex sonorant systems recorded in linguistics, with 12 coronal sonorants alone. Coronal laterals, nasals, and rhotics had a fortis–lenis and a palatalization contrast: .

Sound changes

See also
List of phonetics topics
Obstruent
Continuant
Liquid consonant

References

Bibliography

Manner of articulation